Christian Devont'a Pelham (born February 21, 1995) is an American professional baseball relief pitcher in the San Diego Padres organization. He has played in Major League Baseball (MLB) for the Texas Rangers.

Amateur career
Pelham attended Lancaster High School in Lancaster, South Carolina. Undrafted out of high school, he attended Spartanburg Methodist College to play college baseball. Following his freshman year of college, the Milwaukee Brewers selected him in the 25th round, with the 746th overall selection, of the 2014 MLB draft. He did not sign with Milwaukee, instead returning to college for his sophomore year.

Professional career

Texas Rangers
The Texas Rangers selected Pehlam in the 33rd round of the 2015 MLB draft and he signed with them. He began his professional career with the AZL Rangers of the Rookie-level Arizona League in 2015, going 4–0 with a 5.40 ERA over  innings in 16 games. Pelham spent the 2016 season with the Spokane Indians of the Class A Short Season Northwest League, posting a 0–6 record, 6.16 ERA, and 38 innings in 16 games (7 starts). Pelham spent the 2017 season with the Hickory Crawdads of the Class A South Atlantic League, posting a 4–2 record, 3.18 ERA, 75 strikeouts, and  innings over 37 games. Pelham began the 2018 season with the Down East Wood Ducks of the Class A-Advanced Carolina League, posting a 0–0 record, 1.95 ERA, 34 strikeouts, and  innings in 23 games. He was promoted to the Frisco RoughRiders of the Double-A Texas League on June 22, and posted a 2–0 record, 6.16 ERA, 19 strikeouts, and 19 innings in 24 games. He was selected to represent the Rangers at the 2018 All-Star Futures Game.

The Rangers promoted Pelham to the major leagues on September 4, 2018. Pelham posted a 0–0 record, 7.04 ERA, 7 strikeouts, and  innings in 10 major league games. Following the 2018 season, Pelham played for the Surprise Saguaros of the Arizona Fall League. In 2019, Pelham split the season between Frisco and the Nashville Sounds of the Triple-A Pacific Coast League, combining to go 1–4 with a 11.97 ERA over  innings. Pelham was designated for assignment on November 20, 2019.

Chicago Cubs
On November 27, 2019, the Chicago Cubs claimed Pelham from the Rangers off of waivers. Pelham was outrighted off of the roster on January 24, 2020. He did not play in a game in 2020 due to the cancellation of the minor league season because of the COVID-19 pandemic. Pelham also missed the 2021 season due to an injury.

In 2022, Pelham made 29 appearances split between the Double-A Tennessee Smokies and the Triple-A Iowa Cubs, posting a cumulative 2-1 record and 4.35 ERA with 41 strikeouts and 2 saves in 41.1 innings pitched. He elected free agency following the season on November 10, 2022.

San Diego Padres
On March 9, 2023, Pelham signed a minor league contract with the San Diego Padres organization.

References

External links

1995 births
Living people
African-American baseball players
People from Lancaster, South Carolina
Baseball players from South Carolina
Major League Baseball pitchers
Texas Rangers players
Spartanburg Methodist Pioneers baseball players
Arizona League Rangers players
Spokane Indians players
Hickory Crawdads players
Down East Wood Ducks players
Frisco RoughRiders players
Nashville Sounds players
Tennessee Smokies players
21st-century African-American sportspeople